Mach-Hommy is a Haitian-American rapper. He is well-known for his reclusive nature, concealing his real name and face in all public appearances. This behavior has led him to be described as "one of hip-hop's most elusive artists". Though he predominantly raps in English, he also frequently incorporates Haitian Creole into his lyrics.

Early life
Mach-Hommy was raised predominantly in Newark, New Jersey, but also spent much of his childhood in Port-au-Prince. His father was a folk guitarist, and Mach credits his father's musical style as an influence on his own. The first music Mach recorded was at the age of 13, when he performed a freestyle over the beat to Raekwon's "Verbal Intercourse".

In his early career, Mach found the music recording process to be an "unhealthy" environment and sought to take up filmmaking instead. However, at the encouragement of Westside Gunn, he returned to rapping in the early 2010s.

Career
Mach-Hommy first received widespread attention after the release of his 2016 album, H.B.O. (Haitian Body Odor), which he sold via Instagram. Mach pressed only 187 copies of the H.B.O. CD and sold them for $300 apiece, before eventually uploading the album to SoundCloud in 2017. He released numerous other albums in the following years, many of which were sold at high prices through services like Bandcamp and never released on streaming services.

In 2021, Mach-Hommy released his album Pray for Haiti on most streaming services. Mach stated that he would donate his share of profits from the album to the Pray for Haiti Trust Fund, a charity he established to fund educational services and institutions in Haiti. Pray for Haiti also brought Mach a greater level of attention from the music press, with Pitchfork honoring the album with a "Best New Music" award and Rolling Stone describing it as "a modern hip-hop classic".

Mach-Hommy has intermittently associated with the Griselda Records label. Though Mach was once considered part of the Griselda collective, he separated from them after a falling-out with Westside Gunn, and as of 2017 Mach-Hommy was unaffiliated with the label. Mach and Gunn eventually reconciled in late 2020, as Westside Gunn served as an executive producer of Pray for Haiti.

Personal life
In an interview with Billboard.com, Mach stated that he was fluent in the majority of the Romance languages.

Influences
Mach-Hommy cites a wide range of writers as influential upon him, including William Shakespeare, Chinua Achebe, George Orwell, Lorraine Hansberry, Fyodor Dostoevsky, and Dante. He also cites political and philosophical thinkers such as Malcolm X, C. L. R. James, Thomas Aquinas, and Friedrich Nietzsche.

Discography

Studio albums

Goon Grizzle (2004, re-released in 2017)
F.Y.I. (2013, remastered in 2017)
ETA: Greek Fest (2015)
H.B.O. (Haitian Body Odor) (2016)
Dollar Menu  (2017)
Dollar Menu 2  (2017)
The Spook...  (2017)
Dump Gawd: Hommy Edition (2017)
Dollar Menu 3: Dump Gawd Edition  (2017)
Dumpmeister (2017)
Luh Hertz (2017)
The G.A.T... (2017)
Fete Des Morts AKA Dia De Los Muertos  (2017)
Bulletproof Luh (2018)
Dump Olympics: Wide Berth  (2018)
DUCK CZN: Chinese Algebra  (2018)
Notorious Dump Legends  (2018)
Tuez-Les Tous  (2019)
Wap Konn Jòj! (2019)
Kill Em All  (2019)
Mach's Hard Lemonade (2020)
Pray for Haiti (2021)
Balens Cho (Hot Candles) (2021)
Dollar Menu 4  (2022)
Duck Czn: Tiger Style  (2022)
Notorious Dump Legends Volume 2   (2023)

Compilation albums
Supertape (2012)
MHz (2017)

EPs

Back II The Future (2011)
Depth Cum In 3s (2012)
Uppity N***** (2012)
iGRADE (2013)
Good Grease (2013)
Good Bye Uncle Tom (2013)
#wellBREADUCATED (2013)
May Day (2013)
#foreignOBJECTS (2013)
Don't Get Scared Now  (2016)
Saturday Night Lights, Vol. 1 & 2 (2018)
No Chill 45 Series 001 (2020)
No Chill 45 Series 002 (2020)
Dump Gawd: Triz Nathaniel  (2022)
Dump Gawd: Triz Nathan  (2022)
Dump Gawd: Triz Nate  (2022)
Dump Gawd: Triz 9  (2022)

Guest appearances
"Beloved" by Conway the Machine (Reject 2) (2015)
"Donna Karen" by Westside Gunn (Roses Are Red... So Is Blood) (2016)
"King City" by Westside Gunn (FLYGOD) (2016)
"Floor Seats" by The Alchemist (The Good Book, Vol. 2) (2017)
"Btchs Bru" by Melanin 9 (Old Pictures) (2017)
"Carnies" by Armand Hammer (Rome) (2017)
"Sell Me This Pen" by Evidence (Weather or Not) (2018)
"Daddy Love You" by DJ Preservation (February 4th) (2018)
"Windhoek" by billy woods (Terror Management) (2019)
"4N" by Earl Sweatshirt (Feet of Clay) (2019)
"Wild Minks" Quelle Chris (Guns) (2019)
"Save Me" by Kamaal Williams (Wu Hen) (2020)
"Margiela Split Toes" by Westside Gunn (Hitler Wears Hermes 8: Sincerely Adolf) (2021)
"Best Dressed Demons" by Westside Gunn (Hitler Wears Hermes 8: Side B) (2021)
"RIP Bergdof" by Westside Gunn (Hitler Wears Hermes 8: Side B) (2021)
"$payforhaiti" by Kaytranada (Intimidated) (2021)
"Spin Off" by Big Cheeko (Block Barry White) (2022)
"Double Layup" by Camoflauge Monk (Priye Pou Ayiti) (2022)

As Executive Producer
TGIF by Tha God Fahim (2016)
Wide Berth by Tha God Fahim (2018)
Dump Olympics: Wide Berth by Mach-Hommy & Tha God Fahim (2018)
It Wasn't Even Close by Your Old Droog (2019)
Jewelry by Your Old Droog (2019)
Dump YOD: Krutoy Edition by Your Old Droog (2020)
Tha YOD Fahim by Your Old Droog & Tha God Fahim (2021)
Block Barry White by Big Cheeko (2022)

References

External links 
 
 
 

Living people
Haitian rappers
American male rappers
East Coast hip hop musicians
Rappers from Newark, New Jersey
Underground rappers
21st-century American male musicians
Year of birth missing (living people)
American hip hop record producers
English-language singers
Unidentified musicians
Masked musicians